Hymns for Strange Children is the début album from London-based glam rockers Rachel Stamp. It was released in 2000 on Cruisin' Records. Recorded by John Fryer in as little as two weeks, Rachel Stamp's debut album was a long time in the making. After Rachel Stamp were dropped from WEA in 1997, the original debut album, Fight the Force of Evil, was in serious doubt of ever seeing a release, but the band released a string of hit independent singles, all of which appear on this album.

The album was reissued at the end of the year as a numbered Limited Edition of 1500 2-CD box set with the live album Stampax. The catalogue number was CRRS 003L.

Track listing
 Monsters of the New Wave
 Brand New Toy
 I Got the Worm
 I Wanna Be Your Doll
 Ladies + Gents
 Spank (Katharine Blake mix)
 Didn’t I Break My Heart Over You
 Take a Hold of Yourself
 Pink Skab
 Dirty Bone
 My Sweet Rose [new version]

Limited edition track listing
CD1: Hymns for Strange Children [repackaged]
 Monsters Of The New Wave
 Brand New Toy
 I Got the Worm
 I Wanna Be Your Doll
 Ladies+Gents [listed on the back of the album as 'Ladies & Gents']
 Spank [Katherine Blake mix]
 Didn’t I Break My Heart Over You
 Take a Hold of Yourself
 Pink Skab
 Dirty Bone
 My Sweet Rose [new version]

CD2: Stampax

 Brand New Toy
 Dead Girl
 Tammy Machine
 True Love
 Madonna... Cher... 
 Queen Bee
 Black Tambourine [listed on the back of the album as 'Black Tamborine']
 Feel Like Makin’ Love
 I Like Girlz [listed on the back of the album as 'Like Girlz']
 Girl You’re Just a Slave to Your Man
 Hey Hey Michael You’re Really Fantastic
 Je Suis Maisee
 n.a.u.s.e.a

2000 debut albums
Rachel Stamp albums
Albums produced by John Fryer (producer)